The Rakoczi March is a 1933 drama film directed by Gustav Fröhlich and  Steve Sekely and starring Fröhlich, Leopold Kramer and Camilla Horn.  It was a co-production between Austria, Germany and Hungary. A separate Hungarian-language version, Rákóczi induló, was made.

Cast
 Gustav Fröhlich as Oberleutnant Tarjan
 Leopold Kramer as Graf Job
 Camilla Horn as Vilma, his daughter
 Paul Wagner as Rittmeister Arpad Graf Job, his son
 Ellen Frank as Erika, his niece
 Tibor Halmay as Leutnant Lorant
 Margit Angerer as the recital singer
 László Dezsőffy as the watchman
 Anton Pointner as Merlin, Job's neighbour
 Charles Puffy as the vet
 Willi Schur as Mischka, Tarjan's batman
 Rudolf Teubler as the peasant
 Otto Treßler as the regimental doctor
 Peter Wolff as Fähnrich Bilitzky

References

Bibliography

External links 
 

1933 films
1933 drama films
Austrian drama films
Hungarian drama films
1930s German-language films
Films based on works by Ferenc Herczeg
German multilingual films
Films directed by Gustav Fröhlich
Films directed by Steve Sekely
Films scored by Paul Abraham
Austrian black-and-white films
German black-and-white films
Hungarian black-and-white films
Austrian multilingual films
Hungarian multilingual films
1933 multilingual films